Damián Nicolás Suárez Suárez (born 27 April 1988) is a Uruguayan professional footballer who plays as a right-back for La Liga club Getafe and the Uruguay national team.

Club career
Born in Montevideo, Suárez played four seasons with hometown's Defensor Sporting after joining as an 11-year old, winning the 2008 Uruguayan Primera División. In early June 2011 he moved to La Liga with Sporting de Gijón, signing a three-year deal.

Suárez made his league debut on 11 September 2011, playing the full 90 minutes in a 2–1 away loss against CA Osasuna. In his first season, which ended in relegation, he was mostly used as Alberto Lora's backup.

On 24 July 2012, Suárez terminated his contract with the Asturians and joined Elche CF in Segunda División. He scored his first goal in Spain on 2 March 2013, his team's first in a 2–1 win at Recreativo de Huelva. He appeared in 33 matches during the campaign, as the Valencians returned to the top division after a 24-year absence.

Suárez scored his first goal in the Spanish top flight on 30 March 2014, through a penalty kick for the first in a 1–1 away draw against Villarreal CF. On 7 July 2015, he moved to fellow league team Getafe CF after agreeing to a three-year deal.

On 20 April 2022, after taking the field in the 2–0 away defeat of RC Celta de Vigo, Suárez became Getafe's player with the most appearances in the top tier at 191.

International career
Suárez represented Uruguay at the 2005 FIFA U-17 World Championship and the 2007 FIFA U-20 World Cup. After several call-ups to the senior team, he made his full debut on 27 January 2022 in a 1–0 win against Paraguay in the 2022 FIFA World Cup qualifiers; this made him the oldest outfield player to achieve this for the country, a record which was previously held by Andrés Scotti since 2006.

Personal life
Suárez's younger brother, Mathías, was also a professional footballer.

Career statistics

Club

International

Honours
Defensor
Uruguayan Primera División: 2007–08

Elche
Segunda División: 2012–13

References

External links

1988 births
Living people
Uruguayan footballers
Footballers from Montevideo
Association football defenders
Uruguayan Primera División players
Defensor Sporting players
La Liga players
Segunda División players
Sporting de Gijón players
Elche CF players
Getafe CF footballers
Uruguay youth international footballers
Uruguay under-20 international footballers
Uruguay international footballers
Uruguayan expatriate footballers
Expatriate footballers in Spain
Uruguayan expatriate sportspeople in Spain